The canton of Yzeure is a French administrative division in the department of Allier and region Auvergne-Rhône-Alpes.

Composition 
The communes in the canton of Yzeure: 
 Aurouër
 Gennetines
 Saint-Ennemond
 Trévol
 Villeneuve-sur-Allier
 Yzeure

References

Yzeure